Nikil Dutt is a Chancellor's Professor of Computer Science at University of California, Irvine, United States. Professor Dutt's research interests are in embedded systems, electronic design automation, computer architecture, optimizing compilers, system specification techniques, distributed systems, and formal methods.

Biography
Born and raised in Gangtok, Sikkim, India, Dutt received his Ph.D. in Computer Science from the University of Illinois at Urbana-Champaign in 1989. He received a B.E.(Hons) in Mechanical Engineering from the Birla Institute of Technology and Science, Pilani, India in 1980, an M.S. in Computer Science from the Pennsylvania State University in 1983. In 1989, he joined UC-Irvine as an Assistant Professor of Computer science. He is affiliated with Center for Embedded Computer Systems (CECS), California Institute for Telecommunications and Information Technology (Calit2), the Center for Pervasive Communications and Computing (CPCC), and the Laboratory for Ubiquitous Computing and Interaction (LUCI).

Academic life
His research has been recognized by Best Paper Awards and Best Paper Award Nominations at several conferences. Dutt currently serves as Associate Editor of Association for Computing Machinery Transactions on Embedded Computer Systems (TECS) and of IEEE Transactions on VLSI Systems (TVLSI).

In 2007, he was selected as ACM distinguished scientist and in 2008 an IEEE fellow. He was a keynote speaker at several conferences. Dutt served as Editor-in-Chief of ACM Transactions on Design Automation of Electronic Systems (TODAES) between 2004–2008.

He currently lives in Irvine, California with his family.

Awards
 2014. ACM Fellow.
 For contributions to embedded architecture exploration, and service to electronic design automation and embedded systems.

Books
 High-Level Synthesis: Introduction to Chip and System Design, Kluwer Academic Publishers, 1992
 Memory Issues in Embedded Systems-on-Chip: Optimizations and Exploration, Kluwer Academic Publishers, 1999
 Memory Architecture Exploration for Programmable Embedded Systems, Kluwer Academic Publishers, 2003
 SPARK: A Parallelizing Approach to the High-Level Synthesis of Digital Circuits, by Sumit Gupta, Rajesh K. Gupta, Nikil Dutt, Alex Nicolau, Kluwer Academic Publishers, 2004
 Functional Validation of Programmable Embedded Architectures: A Top-Down Approach, Springer-Verlag, 2005
 On-chip Communication Architectures: Current Practice, Research and Future Trends, Morgan Kaufmann/Elsevier Systems-on-Silicon Series, 2008
 Processor Description Languages: Applications and Methodologies," Morgan Kaufmann/Elsevier Systems-on-Silicon Series, 2008.

References

External links
 Computer Engineering Academic Genealogy

Living people
Indian emigrants to the United States
Grainger College of Engineering alumni
Birla Institute of Technology and Science, Pilani alumni
Pennsylvania State University alumni
American computer scientists
American male writers of Indian descent
Computer science writers
University of California, Irvine faculty
Fellow Members of the IEEE
Formal methods people
Academic journal editors
1958 births